The following lists events that happened during 1979 in Singapore.

Incumbents
President: Benjamin Henry Sheares
Prime Minister: Lee Kuan Yew

Events

January
11 January – The Singapore Refining Company is formed by three oil companies, namely Singapore Petroleum Company, Chevron and BP.
24 January – The Singapore Symphony Orchestra is formed, playing its first concert.

April
1 April – The Vocational and Industrial Training Board is formed from a merger between the Industrial Training Board (ITB) and the Adult Education Board (AEB). The Board handles vocational and industrial training until the formation of Institute of Technical Education in 1992.
16 April – Plans for Raffles City, a future mixed-use development, are unveiled with a model shown to the public. The development will include a mall, an office block and 3 hotel towers; with one standing at about 200 metres high. Costing about S$600m, the development was targeted for completion in 1983, but it only opened in 1986.
20 April – Mitsukoshi Garden is officially opened in Jurong.

June
1 June – The first National Courtesy Campaign is launched.
27 June – Sentosa Development Corporation announced a new monorail system that will replace double-decker buses, as well as a new 10-storey luxury hotel on Fort Siloso.

July
1 July – The four-digit postal code system takes effect, replacing the previous system used since 1950. The system, first announced on 25 April, will help in automating mail sorting processes.
30 July – The Ulu Pandan Incineration Plant is officially opened, making it Singapore's first incineration plant.

September
7 September – The first Speak Mandarin Campaign is launched to encourage Chinese Singaporeans to speak Mandarin instead of dialects.

October
15 October – The first automated teller machine (ATM) in Singapore is launched.
20 October – The first McDonald's outlet opened in Liat Towers.

Date unknown
Singapore becomes the world's second busiest port in terms of shipping tonnage.

Births
 13 February – Jesseca Liu, actress.
 2 May – Joscelin Yeo, former national swimmer.
 26 June – Alaric Tay, actor.
 28 June – Jeanette Aw, actress.
 30 June – Rosanne Wong, former singer and 2R member.
 10 July – Sun Xueling, politician.
 25 November – Chua En Lai, actor.
 25 December – Celest Chong, actress and former singer.
 Ashley Isham, fashion designer.

Deaths
 2 September – Checha Davies - Activist, volunteer, social worker (b. 1898).
 3 September – Lim Cheng Hoe - Pioneering watercolourist (b. 1912).
 2 November – Jah Lelawati - Bangsawan actress, writer (b. 1937).

References

 
Singapore
Years in Singapore